Koritnica is a small settlement northwest of Raka in the Municipality of Krško in eastern Slovenia. The area is part of the traditional region of Lower Carniola. It is now included with the rest of the municipality in the Lower Sava Statistical Region.

The local church is dedicated to Saint Peter and belongs to the Parish of Raka. It is a Baroque church dating to the 17th century.

References

External links
Koritnica on Geopedia

Populated places in the Municipality of Krško